Manuel Antonio Matta (February 27, 1826 – June 12, 1892) was a Chilean politician, lawyer and writer and founder of  the Radical Party of Chile along with Pedro Leon Gallo.

1826 births
1892 deaths
People from Copiapó
Members of the Chamber of Deputies of Chile
Members of the Senate of Chile
Chilean male writers
Foreign ministers of Chile